Shivendra Singh Dungarpur (born 25 August 1969) is an Indian filmmaker, producer, film archivist and restorer. He is best known for his films Celluloid Man, The Immortals and CzechMate: In Search of Jiří Menzel. He has also directed several award-winning commercials and public service campaigns under the banner of Dungarpur Films.

He is the founder Director of Film Heritage Foundation, a non-profit organization dedicated to the preservation and restoration of India’s film heritage.

Shivendra Singh Dungarpur is a member of the Board of Trustees of the Jio MAMI Mumbai Film Festival.

He has been elected three times to the Executive Committee of the International Federation of Film Archives (FIAF) at the elections held at the FIAF Congress 2017 in Los Angeles, FIAF Congress 2019 in Lausanne and the online FIAF Congress in 2021.

Education and early life
Dungarpur was born in Patna, Bihar and belongs to the erstwhile royal family of Dungarpur State that still has its family seat in Dungarpur, Rajasthan and is the nephew of Raj Singh Dungarpur. 

He attended The Doon School, graduating in 1987. He went on to do a degree in History (Hons) from St. Stephen's College, Delhi and shifted to Mumbai soon after to begin his career in film as an assistant director to writer-lyricist and director, Gulzar and worked with him on films like Lekin and Libaas. Subsequently, he enrolled in the Film and Television Institute of India, Pune to study film direction and scriptwriting. He graduated from FTII in 1994.

He was first introduced to the cinema by his maternal grandmother, Usha Rani, Maharani of Dumraon. It was with her and his grandfather Maharaj Kamal Singh of Dumraon that he first saw classics ranging from Pakeezah to Chaplin, Buster Keaton, Laurel & Hardy and Danny Kaye at summer evening screenings on 16 mm and 8 mm projectors in the verandah of their home in Dumraon.

Career
Shivendra Singh Dungarpur started his production house Dungarpur Films in 2001. Under this banner, he has directed and produced commercials and documentaries for numerous brands over the years.

In 2014, he founded Film Heritage Foundation to preserve India's endangered film heritage. Film Heritage Foundation is a non-profit organization based in Mumbai which is dedicated to supporting the conservation, preservation and restoration of the moving image and to developing interdisciplinary programs to create awareness about the language of cinema.

Shivendra Singh Dungarpur is a member of the Board of Trustees of the Jio MAMI Mumbai Film Festival.

He is a supporting member of the Fondazione Cineteca di Bologna, Italy along with the legendary Pathé film company. He is a member of the Artistic Committee of the Il Cinema Ritrovato Festival in Bologna and also a member of the Honorary Committee of the Nitrate Picture Show, George Eastman House's Festival of Film Conservation. He was a member of the Expert Committee of the National Museum of Indian Cinema.

Filmography
Shivendra Singh Dungarpur directed his first documentary in 2012, called Celluloid Man, which won the National Film Award for Best Biographical Film and National Film Award for Best Historical Reconstruction/Compilation Film. The filming of the documentary began in 2010 and it was completed in May 2012. The film premiered at the Il Cinema Ritrovato Festival in Bologna, Italy on 26 June 2012. It was the opening film at the Sierra Leone International Film Festival, 2013, and the Kyiv International Documentary Film Festival, 2013 where it won the "Nestor The Chronicler" award for the best archival film. In 2018, Dungarpur was invited by the Academy of Motion Picture Arts and Sciences to speak about his efforts in preserving India's cinematic heritage, which was followed by a screening of his documentary Celluloid Man.

Dungarpur's second documentary The Immortals was completed in August 2015 and premiered at the 20th Busan International Film Festival in October. This film is a personal journey travelling through time and space to unravel hidden stories and rediscover objects and images that at one time were an integral part of the lives of these artists through which their creations came into being. The film was screened at the 17th Jio MAMI Mumbai Film Festival and was the opening film in the Documentary Section at the 21st Kolkata International Film Festival. The Immortals won the Special Jury Award in the National Competition Section of the Mumbai International Film Festival (MIFF) for Documentaries, Short and Animation Films in 2016. and was screened at the 30th edition of the Il Cinema Ritrovato festival in Bologna in the same year.

In 2018, Dungarpur released the 420-minute documentary CzechMate: In Search of Jiří Menzel, based on the life of Czech film and theatre director, screenwriter, and actor, Jiří Menzel. The seven-hour-long film was eight years in the making and features extensive interviews with 85 filmmakers, actors and film historians including Woody Allen, Ken Loach, and Emir Kusturica. The film had its debut at a screening at the UCLA Film & Television Archive in September 2018 and has also been screened at the 20th Jio MAMI Mumbai Film Festival. The film has been showcased at the 24th Kolkata International Film Festival in November 2018, the Il Cinema Ritrovato in Bologna, and screenings in Prague, Slovakia and London. The British Film Institute and Sight & Sound The International Film Magazine polled "CzechMate – In Search of Jiri Menzel" in the top 5 Blu-Ray and DVD releases of 2020 in a vote by eminent film critics.

Acting
Shivendra acted in the film “Knock on the Door” directed by Ranjan Palit along with a cast of actors that included Naseeruddin Shah, Adil Hussain, Nandita Das, Ratna Pathak Shah and Amrita Chattopadhyay. The film was selected for the International Film Festival of Rotterdam (IFFR) in 2023.

In 2022, he was offered a role in the Hindi film "Ghoomer" directed by R. Balki where he plays a prominent role along with a cast comprising  Shabana Azmi, Saiyami Kher, and Abhishek Bachchan.

Short films and television 
Shivendra directed a 26-episode series Rahe Na Rahe Hum produced by Contiloe Films for Star TV and hosted by scriptwriter and lyricist Javed Akhtar. He also produced a five-episode serial for Doordarshan based on the classic novel Bhoole Bisre Chitra written by Shri Bhagwati Charan Verma. Dungarpur Films has produced two short films I became… and Room 19. I became… was given a gold medal at the IDPA Awards 2006 for the Best Short Fiction film of the year. It also won the award for the Best Short Film at the Marbella Film Festival in 2007 and was shortlisted for the Kathmandu Film Festival 2008.

Awards
2016 – Special Jury Award for "The Immortals" in the National Competition Section of the 14th Mumbai International Film Festival (MIFF)
2014 – Special Jury Award for Celluloid Man at the 13th edition of the Mumbai International Film Festival (MIFF)
2013 – His first feature-length documentary Film "Celluloid Man" (2012) has won two National Awards in India at the 60th National Film Award for Best Historical Reconstruction/Compilation Film and for Best Editing. He also won the "Nestor the Chronicler" award for the best archival film for Celluloid Man at the XII Kyiv International Documentary Film Festival 
2013 – Bimal Roy Memorial Emerging Talent Award for "Celluloid Man"

Film preservation and restoration
Shivendra was a donor for the British Film Institute's restoration of Alfred Hitchcock's silent film, The Lodger: A Story of the London Fog. In 2010, Dungarpur was approached by Martin Scorsese's organization World Cinema Project, which was interested in restoring the 1948 classic Kalpana directed by Uday Shankar. Shivendra facilitated the restoration of the film that was done by Martin Scorsese's World Cinema Foundation, that was premiered in the Cannes Film Festival Classic section in 2012. In 2013, he collaborated with the World Cinema Foundation again for the restoration of the 1972 Sinhalese film "Nidhanaya" directed by eminent Sri Lankan filmmaker Dr. Lester James Peries. The restored version of the film was premièred at the Venice International Film Festival, 2013.

Film Heritage Foundation

In 2014, Film Heritage Foundation, a non-profit organization  was founded by Shivendra Singh Dungarpur. The organization preserves India's cinematic heritage, and supports the conservation, preservation and restoration of the moving image and develops interdisciplinary educational programs that  use film as an educational tool and create awareness about the language of cinema. This is the first non-governmental organization dedicated to the conservation of the moving image in India. Film Heritage Foundation was accepted as an associate member of FIAF (International Federation of Film Archives) at the General Assembly held in Sydney in April 2015.

In 2022, under the aegis of Shivendra Singh Dungarpur, Film Heritage Foundation’s restoration of the Malayalam film Thampu (1978) directed by the auteur Aravindan Govindan was selected for a world premiere in the Cannes Classic section of the Cannes Film Festival 2022. The restoration partners of 'Thamp̄u’ and Jalaja, the actress from the film and Prakash Nair, producer, General Pictures, walked the red carpet lead by Shivendra Singh Dungarpur to announce the film. The screening of the film was held on 21 May 2022.

Writing
Shivendra's essay "Magic of Celluloid" has been published in the book "From Darkness into Light – Perspectives on Film Preservation and Restoration" edited by Rajesh Devraj.

Shivendra Singh Dungarpur was among twenty film scholars, archivists and historians from different countries invited to contribute an essay to a landmark publication titled “Keeping Memories: Cinema and Archiving in Asia-Pacific” edited by Nick Deocampo and published by the Southeast Asia Pacific Audio-visual Archive Association (SEAPAVAA), Film Development Council of the Philippines, Vietnam Film Institute, through Ateneo University Press.

He has written for several publications and newspapers including IIC Quarterly Journal, The Telegraph, The Hindu and The Tribune.

References

External links

Living people
1969 births
St. Stephen's College, Delhi alumni
Delhi University alumni
Film and Television Institute of India alumni
The Doon School alumni
People from Patna
Conservator-restorers
Indian film producers
Indian film editors
Indian documentary filmmakers
Film producers from Mumbai
Film directors from Mumbai
20th-century Indian film directors
21st-century Indian film directors
National Film Award (India) winners